Club Atlético Brown (mostly known as Brown de Adrogué) is an Argentine football club from the Adrogué neighborhood in Greater Buenos Aires. The team currently plays in Primera B Nacional, the second division of the Argentine football league system.

History

The club was formed in 1945 as a multidisciplinary sports club. Brown, which has never played in Primera División, reached its highest league position in the 1999–00 season, finishing in 1st place in Primera B Metropolitana tournament, but could not promote to Primera B Nacional, being defeated in the play-off semi-final.

In June 2013, Brown won the play-off series defeating Almagro at the finals by penalty shoot-out. Therefore the squad promoted to the upper division, Primera B Nacional, for the first time in the history of the club.

Brown de Adrogué won its second title in 2015, the Primera B Metropolitana championship, therefore the squad promoted to the second division, Primera B Nacional. In September 2018, Brown achieved its most important victory to date, when the squad eliminated Independiente from the Copa Argentina after beating them by penalty shoot-out.

Players

Current squad

Out on loan

Honours
Primera D (1): 1980
Primera B (1): 2015

References

External links

Club website  
La Hora Tricolor 

 
Association football clubs established in 1945
Almirante Brown Partido
1945 establishments in Argentina
Football clubs in Buenos Aires Province